Florissant is an unincorporated town, a post office, and a census-designated place (CDP) located in and governed by Teller County, Colorado, United States. The CDP is a part of the Colorado Springs, CO Metropolitan Statistical Area. The Florissant post office has the ZIP Code 80816. At the United States Census 2020, the population of the Florissant CDP was 128, while the population of the 80816 ZIP Code Tabulation Area was 5,180 including adjacent areas.

Etymology

Florissant, Colorado, was named after Florissant, Missouri, the hometown of Judge James Castello, an early settler.  The word florissant is the gerund of the French verb fleurir, which roughly means to flourish, to flower, or to blossom.

Geography
Florissant is located immediately north of Florissant Fossil Beds National Monument.

Demographics

Town
Florissant is immediately east of the starting point of the Hayman fire, which became most extensive fire in Colorado history in 2002.

Florissant is served by the Florissant Fire Protection District. The District consists of 2 Fire Stations, 3 Engines, 2 Tenders, 3 Rescue Trucks, and a Mule 4WD off-road vehicle.

Florissant has several subdivisions, including Colorado Mountain Estates, Druid Hills, Florissant Heights, Indian Creek, Wilson Lakes, Valley Hi, and Bear Trap Ranch

Florissant continues to grow.  Examples of this include the addition of a new library, offering multimedia opportunities, fast broadband, computer access, and wireless access.

See also

Outline of Colorado
Index of Colorado-related articles
State of Colorado
Colorado cities and towns
Colorado census designated places
Colorado counties
Teller County, Colorado
Colorado metropolitan areas
Front Range Urban Corridor
South Central Colorado Urban Area
Colorado Springs, CO Metropolitan Statistical Area
Florissant Fossil Beds National Monument

References

External links

Florissant @ UncoverColorado.com
Florissant @ TellerLinks.com
Florissant Fossil Beds National Monument
Pikes Peak Historical Society website
Rampart Library District website
Teller County website

Census-designated places in Teller County, Colorado
Census-designated places in Colorado